The Keewatin-Patricia District School Board (known as English-language Public District School Board No. 5A prior to 1999) oversees public education in the Kenora District of northwestern Ontario. Its jurisdiction includes a geographic area of 6,565 km2 from the Manitoba border to roughly the western tip of Lake Superior. 

The KPDSB was formed in 1998 as a merger of the Kenora, Red Lake and Dryden school boards. The French schools in the county became part of the new Conseil scolaire de district du Grand Nord de l’Ontario.

The six high schools administered by the KPDSB are:
Beaver Brae Secondary School in Kenora
Crolancia Public School in Pickle Lake
Dryden High School in Dryden
Ignace High School in Ignace
Sioux North High School - replaced Queen Elizabeth District High School in Sioux Lookout in 2014
Red Lake District High School in Red Lake
Keewatin Public-Kenora

See also
Kenora Catholic District School Board
List of school districts in Ontario
List of high schools in Ontario

References

School districts in Ontario
Education in Kenora District
Kenora